James Anthony William Prosser  (born 3 May 1954), usually known as Tony Prosser, is professor of public law at the University of Bristol, having previously been John Millar Professor of Law, at the University of Glasgow. His research focuses on legal aspects of regulation and privatisation.

In 2014 he was elected a Fellow of the British Academy, the United Kingdom's national academy for the humanities and social sciences.

References

Fellows of the British Academy
Academics of the University of Bristol
English economists
Academics of the University of Glasgow
1954 births

Living people